High Island Creek is a  tributary of the Minnesota River in Minnesota.

The creek took its name from High Island Lake, a lake along its course.

See also
List of rivers of Minnesota

References

Minnesota Watersheds
USGS Hydrologic Unit Map - State of Minnesota (1974)

Rivers of Minnesota
Rivers of Renville County, Minnesota
Rivers of Sibley County, Minnesota
Rivers of McLeod County, Minnesota